The J.D. Woodruff Cabin Site is the location of the first European-American settlement in the Big Horn Basin of Wyoming. John Dwight Woodruff built a cabin on Owl Creek in Hot Springs County in 1871. Woodruff had befriended Chief Washakie of the Shoshone people and gained Washakie's permission to graze six thousand sheep in the area, one of the first large sheep operations in Wyoming. He ran cattle in the area during the 1880s.

The interior featured an earth floor covered with buffalo hides.

John Dwight Woodruff was born in Broome County, New York on December 20, 1847. Woodruff is believed to have built the cabin principally as a winter trapping camp and as a base for prospecting in the early summer.

Woodruff sold the cabin to Captain R.A. Torrey of the U.S. Army garrison at Fort Washakie. Along with his brother, Colonel J.L. Torrey, Torrey expanded the operation, creating the Embar Ranch with forty thousand cattle and six thousand horses. The cabin was demolished at some point in the development of the ranch compound.

The site is marked by a monument composed of boulders and petrified wood with a tile image and a bronze plaque, giving an erroneous date of 1873 for the establishment of the camp. The monument is in poor condition and is out of place in its setting.

The Woodruff Cabin site was listed on the National Register of Historic Places in 1970.

References

External links
 Woodruff Cabin Site Wyoming State Historic Preservation Office

Houses on the National Register of Historic Places in Wyoming
Buildings and structures in Hot Springs County, Wyoming
Monuments and memorials in Wyoming
National Register of Historic Places in Hot Springs County, Wyoming